The Mary From Dungloe International Festival is a popular Irish music festival held annually, usually at the end of July in the small town of Dungloe, County Donegal. The festival is centred on a pageant to find out which contestant has the spirit of the festival, who is then crowned "Mary From Dungloe". The winner of the contest holds this title for a year and acts as an ambassador for the festival. Irish emigrant communities from around the world, as well as some Irish counties and towns, participate by nominating a young woman, endearingly titled a "Mary", to represent their community at the contest. The festival has grown in popularity over the years and now regularly attracts tens of thousands of visitors to the area. The festival is inspired by the song "Mary from Dungloe" as the Rose of Tralee festival is by "The Rose of Tralee". In 2019, the festival celebrated its 52nd anniversary, with Roisin Maher from New York becoming Mary From Dungloe 2019.

Participating communities 
Many communities around the world with links to County Donegal have their own local contests to pick their community's "Mary" who subsequently is nominated to travel to Dungloe to compete in the Mary From Dungloe contest. Irish communities who have entered contestants include:

Traditional festival events 
There are a number of traditional events which are run every year as part of the festival. Here are just a few examples:
{| class="wikitable"
! Event !! Traditional Location
|-
| Opening Ceremony || Main St.
|-
| Introduction of MFD Contestants || Main St.
|-
| Country Sunday || Main St.
|-
| Lá Gaelach || Main St.
|-
| Open Air Music || Main St.
|-
| Art Exhibition || Sharkey's Service Station / Ionad Teampaill Chróine
|-
| McGurk's Fun Fair || The Cope Car Park, Quay Road
|-
| Childrens Sports Day || CLG An Clochán Liath/Dungloe GAA Grounds
|-
| Men's Golf Open || Cruit Island Golf Club
|-
| Ladies Golf Open || Cruit Island Golf Club
|-
| Treasure Hunt || Main St. starting point
|-
| Annual 5K Road Race || Main St. & surrounds
|-
| Fly Fishing Competition || Dungloe Marina
|-
| Little Miss Mary Competition || Parochial Hall/ CDP na Rosann
|-
| Table Quiz || Maghery Community Centre/ Midway Bar & Restaurant
|-
| Junior Table Quiz || Ionad Teampall Cróine
|-
| Social Evening with the Marys || Various

| Historic Tour of the Rosses || Departs Main St.

| Walk the Rosses || Dungloe area, Leitir/Lettermacaward, Maghery, Rann na Feirste, Loch an Iúir, Burtonport

| Interviewing of the MFD Contestants || Carrickfinn Airport / Rosses Community School
|-
| Bonny Baby Show || Parochial Hall
|-
| Daniel O'Donnell in Concert || Festival Dome
|-
| Carnival Parade || Main St.
|-
| Band Competition || Main St.
|-
| MFD Contest Final || Festival Dome / Ionad Spóirt na Rosann
|-
| Gala Ball || Waterfront Hotel
|-
| Closing Ceremony || Main St.
|-
|}

2022 Contestants

As the festival had been cancelled in 2020 and a virtual Mary contest took place in 2021 due to Covid-19, the selected 2020 contestants or 'Marys' took part in the 2022 festival.

These contestants are as follows

 Shannon Hester - Bayonne
 Caroline Galvin - Belfast
 India Kennedy - Donegal
 Ann-Michelle McConalogue - Dublin
 Libby McCole - Dungloe
 Shauna Ní Dhochartaigh - Gaeltacht
 Cíara Gallagher-Murphy - Glasgow
 Caitlin Finn – London 
 Saoirse Moloney Stevenson - New York
 Olivia Lisowski - Philadelphia
 Sarah Lawlor – San Francisco 
 Kaitlyn Likas – Washington DC

Contest winners 
Below is a complete list of contest winners from 1968 to 2007.

Entertainers and musicians 
Many Irish and international acts have performed at the festival over the years. The traditional annual crowd puller, however, continues to be internationally renowned folk singer Daniel O'Donnell, who made his festival debut in 1985.

 Daniel O'Donnell, Boyzone, Brian Kennedy, Donal Lunny, Altan, The Hothouse Flowers, Goats Don't Shave. Nathan Carter, Christy Moore, The Sawdoctors, Paul Brady, Shane McGowan
 Barry Sinclair, Jimmy Buckley, Hugo Duncan, Mad Dog Macrea, Louise DaCosta, Riverdance, Jake Carter and many more.

Famous comperes 
The Mary From Dungloe contest final has been compered by a number of famous faces.
 Gay Byrne
 Daniel O'Donnell
 Marty Whelan
 Pat Kenny
 Thelma Mansfield
 Gerry Kelly
 Noel Cunningham
 Dave O'Connor

External links 
 
 Linda Farrell Is Mary From Dungloe, 1986 episode of Faces and Places from the RTÉ Television archives
https://www.donegallive.ie/news/donegal-life/874310/winner-of-the-2022-mary-from-dungloe-international-arts-festival-is-chosen.html
https://www.donegaldaily.com/2022/08/01/london-mary-caitlin-is-the-2022-mary-from-dungloe/
https://www.donegallive.ie/news/west-donegal/874370/gallery-2022-mary-from-dungloe-winner-london-mary-caitlin-finn.html

Annual events in Ireland
Beauty pageants in Ireland
Culture in County Donegal
Festivals in Ireland
July events
Tourist attractions in County Donegal
Summer events in the Republic of Ireland